Set The Sun is the debut EP by American punk rock band Set The Sun, released on May 31, 2011.

Background 
Set The Sun was formed in 2009 by David Southern at the age of 17 in Dallas, Texas. Southern began writing songs solo before enlisting the help of Nate Anderson, Arturo Pina, Dakota Price, Brandon Daniels and Alex Summers in early 2010. The band began writing music and playing shows, before entering the studio in early 2011 to record their debut.

Set The Sun then released their first single on April 10, 2011, entitled No Knives For Nathan.

Following No Knives For Nathan, on May 31, 2011 Set The Sun was officially released.

Music 
With Set The Sun the band uses elements of metalcore, electronicore, post-hardcore, progressive metalcore and heavy metal and has been compared to acts such as Attack Attack!, Asking Alexandria, August Burns Red, Architects, The Devil Wears Prada, The Word Alive, We Came as Romans and Woe, Is Me.

John Stokedton Vs The State Of Gnarnia has been called progressive metalcore and compared to Architects and No Knives For Nathan has been compared to Avenged Sevenfold, Black Veil Brides, Asking Alexandria, All That Remains, Killswitch Engage and Death.

Additionally, this EP was hailed for instrumentation on vocals, keyboard and drums however panned for its use of "Basic and generic guitar parts and practically inaudible bass."

Track listing

Personnel 
Nate Anderson - Unclean vocals
David Southern - Clean vocals, rhythm guitar
Arturo Pina - Lead guitar
Dakota Price - Bass
Brandon Daniels - Keyboard
Alex Summers - Drums

References 

2011 EPs
Metalcore EPs
Post-hardcore EPs
The White Noise albums